Dmitri Vladimirovich Kurayev (born 1 August 1995) is a Russian football player.

Club career
He made his professional debut in the Russian Football National League for FC Volga Nizhny Novgorod on 19 July 2014 in a game against FC Anzhi Makhachkala.

Personal life
His father Vladimir Kurayev also was a footballer.

References

External links
 Career summary by sportbox.ru

1995 births
Sportspeople from Nizhny Novgorod
Living people
Russian footballers
Association football defenders
FC Volga Nizhny Novgorod players
FC Nizhny Novgorod (2015) players
FC Khimik Dzerzhinsk players
FC Volga Ulyanovsk players